The Belize Olympic and Commonwealth Games Association, formerly the British Honduras Olympic and Commonwealth Games Association, (IOC code: BIZ) is the National Olympic Committee and Commonwealth Games Association of Belize, responsible for the country's representation at both the Olympic and Commonwealth Games.

History 
The British Honduras Olympic and Commonwealth Games Association was founded in 1967 and recognised that same year by the Commonwealth Games Federation, which had previously recognised the British Honduras Amateur Athletic Association (now the Belize Athletic Association). It was recognised the following year by the International Olympic Committee. In 1973, its name was changed to the Belize Olympic and Commonwealth Games Association.

The Association's most recent elections were held on 18 February 2017, with Hilberto Martinez and Allan Sharp assuming office as President and Secretary General, respectively.

Activities 
The Association is primarily responsible for funding athletes' training and travel to sporting competitions. In 2022, it commissioned the construction of Olympic House, which is partially meant to provide its affiliated sporting federations and athletes with office and training space.

Affiliated bodies

Controversies 
The Association, deemed '[possibly] the most important sporting body in Belize,' has been criticised for defying 'every norm of democratic governance.' Its second President, Ned Pitts, held office 'for 42 years and did not face an open election in decades.' By 2013, it was claimed that 'no one can rightly recall when the last election was held.'

Notes and references

Explanatory footnotes

Short citations

Full citations

See also 
 Belize at the Olympics
 Belize at the Commonwealth Games

Belize
Belize
Oly
Belize at the Olympics
Sports organizations established in 1968